James Andrew Taylor (September 8, 1835February 15, 1906) was an American businessman, Democratic politician, and Wisconsin pioneer.  He was the first mayor of Chippewa Falls, Wisconsin, and represented Chippewa County for three terms in the Wisconsin State Assembly.

Biography

James A. Taylor was born September 8, 1835, in the town of Argyle, New York.  As a young man, he moved to Lansing, Iowa, then came to Chippewa Falls, Wisconsin, in 1854.  He worked for the merchant company H. S. Allen & Co., clerking aboard their steamboat during the summers, and in their stores in the winters.  In 1856, he formed a partnership with Fred H. Bussy to open his own general store.  He served as village treasurer for two terms in 1858 and 1859.

He constructed the Gravel Island mill in 1864, which he sold to the French Lumbering Company in 1875. Chippewa Falls was incorporated as a city in 1869, and at their first election, in 1870, Taylor was chosen as mayor.  In 1883, after a fire in the city destroyed the hotel, he constructed the "Taylor Block" which he operated as a new hotel for four years.  The "Taylor Block" still stands today as part of the Bridge Street Commercial Historic District, in the National Register of Historic Places.

Taylor was active and loyal to the Democratic Party.  He was elected on the Democratic ticket to the Wisconsin State Assembly in 1880, 1882, and 1890.

In 1902, Taylor moved west to Portland, Oregon.  He died there four years later on February 15, 1906.

References

|-

1835 births
1906 deaths
People from Argyle, New York
Politicians from Chippewa Falls, Wisconsin
Politicians from Portland, Oregon
Democratic Party members of the Wisconsin State Assembly
Mayors of places in Wisconsin
19th-century American politicians